Okanagan, or Colville-Okanagan, or Nsyilxcən (n̓səl̓xcin̓, n̓syilxčn̓), is a Salish language which arose among the indigenous peoples of the southern Interior Plateau region based primarily in the Okanagan River Basin and the Columbia River Basin in precolonial times in Canada and the United States.  Following British, American, and Canadian colonization during the 1800s and the subsequent assimilation of all Salishan tribes, the use of Colville-Okanagan declined drastically.

Colville-Okanagan is highly endangered, is rarely learned as a first but is being learned as a second language by more than 40 adults and 35 children in the City of Spokane, Washington, and by several dozen adults on the Colville Indian Reservation in Washington State by among Okanagan people in the Okanagan Valley of British Columbia. About 50 deeply fluent first-language speakers of Colville-Okanagan Salish remain, the majority of whom live in the Okanagan Valley of British Columbia. The language is currently moribund and has no first-language speakers younger than 50 years of age. Colville-Okanagan is the second-most spoken Salish language after Shuswap.

History and description
Historically, Colville-Okanagan originated from a language which was spoken in the Columbia River Basin and is now termed Proto Southern Interior Salish.  As a result of the initial expansion of Colville-Okanagan prior to European contact, the language developed three separate dialects: Colville, Okanagan, and Lakes.  A low degree of dialectic divergence exists in terms of vocabulary and grammar.  Variation is primarily confined to minor differences in pronunciation.

The vast majority of Colville-Okanagan words are from Proto-Salish or Proto-Interior Salish.  A number of Colville-Okanagan words are shared with or borrowed from the neighboring Salish, Sahaptian, and Kutenai languages. More recent loanwords are from English and French. Colville-Okanagan was an exclusively oral form of communication until the late 19th century, when priests and linguists began transcribing the language for word lists, dictionaries, grammars, and translations. Colville-Okanagan is currently written in Latin script using the American Phonetic Alphabet.

In Colville-Okanagan the language itself is known as n̓səl̓xčin̓ or nsyilxcn. Speakers of n̓səl̓xčin̓ occupied the northern portion of the Columbia Basin from the Methow River in the west, to Kootenay Lake in the east, and north along the Columbia River and the Arrow Lakes, as well as the Slocan Valley.  In Colville-Okanagan, all nsyilxcn-speaking bands are grouped under the ethnic label syil̓x. Syil̓x means "Salish" and is a cognate of the Spokane-Kalispel word, séliš, the enthnonym of the Bitterroot Salish people of Montana.  Colville-Okanagan is the heritage language of the Lower Similkameen Indian Band, the Upper Similkameen Indian Band, the Westbank First Nation, the Osoyoos Indian Band, the Penticton Indian Band, the Okanagan Indian Band, the Upper Nicola Indian Band, and the Colville, Sanpoil, Okanogan, Lakes, Nespelem, and Methow bands of the Confederated Tribes of the Colville Reservation. According to nsyilxcən language keepers, words in the nsyilxcən language should not be capitalized. As described in an Indiginews article, "In an egalitarian society, capitalization insinuates there is something that holds more importance over another, and that does not fall in line with syilx ethics".

Revitalization 
In 2012, the CBC featured a report on a family which is teaching its children n̓səl̓xcin̓ in the home.

Six nonprofit organizations which support Colville-Okanagan language acquisition and revitalization are the Paul Creek Language Association in Keremeos, British Columbia, the syilx Language House in Oliver, British Columbia, the En'owkin Centre in Penticton, British Columbia, the Hearts Gathered Waterfall Montessori in Omak, Washington, the Salish School of Spokane in Spokane, Washington, and the Inchelium Language and Culture Association in Inchelium.

Revitalization in the United States 

Revitalization efforts for Colville-Okanagan in the United States include instruction for children and intensive programs for training new adult speakers. However, concentrated efforts are made on the part of the Confederated Tribes of the Colville Reservation to promote language preservation. Among the activities in which the Confederation takes part are allocating funds both local and federal for cultural preservation projects. The Confederated Tribes' goals are to establish three language programs, develop language dictionaries, provide translation services and curriculum, and establish language classes with a regular attendance of 30 or more people. Though the Confederation's efforts are laudable, the limitations of 50 truly native speakers are evident. Language revitalization on the scale the Confederation proposes is limited by the number of native speakers available for those projects. Despite the confederation's efforts, language revitalization cannot be reproduced on such a large scale in the short run.

Salish School of Spokane (SSOS)(sƛ̓x̌atkʷ nsəl̓xčin̓ sn̓maʔmáyaʔtn̓) in  Washington State has a comprehensive community language revitalization strategy for Colville-Okanagan Salish. This school serves Colville-Okanagan people in the Spokane Metro Area. Salish School of Spokane serves both children and adults. SSOS currently (2021-22 school year) serves children aged 1 year old up to 9th grade with Salish immersion education. P-6 classrooms are 100% n̓səl̓xčin̓ immersion classes in which the language of instruction is n̓səl̓xčin and math, literacy, science, art, music and physical education are taught in n̓səl̓xčin. The school's programs are designed to spur full fluency in Colville-Okanagan by the age of 15. According to school expectations and curricula, children are expected to speak Colville-Okanagan for the duration of their time in school. In addition to programming for children, in July 20222, SSOS is also providing intensive n̓səl̓xčin training to more than 40 adults. Twenty-eight staff members at SSOS are enrolled in the Salish Language Educator Development (SLED) program at SSOS. These staff members receive 90 minutes of immersion n̓səl̓xčin training daily as part of their work. Another 16 adults, parents of SSOS students, participate in paid afternoon and evening n̓səlxčin̓ fluency track training. All SSOS parents commit to completing at least 60 hours of n̓səl̓xčin̓ language classes per year in order for their children to be eligible to attend the school. SSOS offers free, beginning n̓səl̓xčin̓ (Colville-Okanagan) language classes on evenings and weekends for SSOS parents and other community members. At Salish School of Spokane, there are 35 intergenerational pairs- 35 immersion school students who have at least one parent who is studying n̓səl̓xčin in a fluency-track program.

Salish School of Spokane makes a point of not falling into the trap of monopolizing teaching resources. Unlike Walsh's examples of tribes opting to not share materials, Salish School maintains a variety of audio resources and curricula to advance Colville-Okanagan revitalization. Along with these efforts, the school not only provides curriculum, but also helps develop and translate it. The Salish School works alongside organizations such as the Paul Creek Language Association, a nonprofit based in British Columbia, on the N̓səl̓xcin̓ Curriculum Project. The N̓səl̓xcin̓ Project aims to create foundational lesson plans from which teachers of Okanagan can draw. The project is spearheaded by Christopher Parkin, and is translated primarily by the fluent elder Sarah Peterson, with the additional help of Hazel Abrahamson and Herman Edwards. The participation of native speakers ensures clear meaning and high fidelity to the Okanagan language. The project is composed of six textbooks divided into three levels: beginner, intermediate, and advanced. Each level consists of a language book which contains a number of audio recordings, language, and learning software to ease language teaching. Additionally, each level includes a literature book. The literature book provides the vital function of providing entertainment for language learners when outside of class and also reinforces sentence construction for Okanagan. The project also contains daily quizzes, midterm-style tests, and both oral and written final exams for evaluation. Most importantly, the curriculum developed by the N̓səl̓xcin̓ Curriculum Project is available in electronic format online free of charge.

Revitalization in Canada 

To encourage interest in teaching vocations, the En'owkin places a strong emphasis on its various certification programs. The Certificate of Aboriginal Language Revitalization is offered in the En'owkin Centre and is taught by linguist Maxine Baptiste. The course does have a fee involved, but the certificate is offered in partnership with the University of Victoria. Additionally, the centre also offers a certification to become a Certified Early Childhood Education Assistant which is in partnership with Nicola Valley Institute of Technology. The certificate does not qualify one to teach at the secondary level, but does ensure employability in daycare and pre-K. The strategy behind these two certificates ensures that potential teachers have easy access to college credits from centers of higher learning like the University of Victoria, and potential education assistants can be involved in the education of children, thus establishing fluency in Okanagan early on. 
Finally, the En'owkin Centre places a heavy emphasis on its college readiness programs. The importance of these programs lies not only in setting up Indigenous students for success, but also incorporating Colville-Okanagan courses into curriculum for young adult to adult students. William Cohen notes in his article, that many native students perform poorly in school and the high school dropout rate for aboriginal high schoolers is very high.

Additionally, a Syilx Language House was developed in 2015 in British Columbia. The goal of the house is to create 10 fluent nsyilxcen speakers in four years. In this program, participants spend 2000 hours over four years learning nsyilxcen via a variety of different teaching methods, regular assessments, frequent visits from Elders, and full immersion. Following completion of the program in 2020, the Syilx Language House is hoping to expand by developing more language houses across the Okanagan and will increase the goal to creating 100 new nsyilxcn speakers in the 2020 cohort. 

Moreover, created in 2021 the University of British Columbia Okanagan (UBCO) offers the Bachelor of nsyilxcn Language Fluency (BNLF) program, that was created in collaboration with the Nicola Valley Institute of Technology (NVIT) and the En’owkin Centre. It is designed to work closely with the community to provide comprehensive and high-quality education and to promote new, fluent speakers with a deep understanding of the language, culture, and customs. UBCO is the first university in Canada and one of the first in the world to offer a degree program in an Indigenous language. This degree program will boost the number of fluent nsyilxcn speakers at a crucial time as the nsyilxcn language is critically endangered.

Orthography 
The Paul Creek Language Association uses this alphabet:

The letters with acute accent á, ə́, í, and ú are not counted as separate letters in this alphabet.

The Westbank First Nation uses this alphabet, in which the letters with acute accent are counted as separate letters:

Phonology

Consonants 
Consonant inventory of Colville-Okanagan:

Vowels 

The vowels found in Lakes are: [i], [a], [u], [ə], and [o]. Stress will fall only on the full vowels [i], [a], and [u] in Colville-Okanagan.

Morphology 

The morphology of Colville-Okanagan is fairly complex. It is a head-marking language that relies mostly on grammatical information being placed directly on the predicate by means of affixes and clitics. The combination of derivational and inflectional suffixes and prefixes that are added onto the stem words make for a compact language.

Person markers 

Colville-Okanagan demonstrates great flexibility when dealing with persons, number, and gender. The language encodes the person via a series of prefixes and suffixes, and uses its number system in tandem with pluralized pronominals to communicate the number of actors within a sentence. For example:

In this example the /k/ classification designates that the word contains a numeral classifier.

Additionally, Colville-Okanagan relies heavily on the use of suffixes to designate gender. Okanagan handles gender in much the same way, by attaching both determiner and ‘man' to the sentence, the gender of an object or subject can be communicated:

In this example, there is a combination of 2nd singular marker with ‘wife.' ‘She' is encoded into the meaning of the word via the inclusion of the gender suffix at the end of the sentence.

Person markers within Colville-Okanagan are attached to verbs, nouns, or adjectives. The marker used depending on transitivity of verbs and other conditions outlined below. The person maker used largely depends on the case being used in the sentence.

Absolutive case 

Absolutive markers within Colville-Okanagan can only be used if the predicate of the sentence is intransitive.
For example, [Kən c'k-am] (I count) is perfectly viable in Colville-Okanagan, but *[Kən c'k-ən-t] *(I count it)is not because the verb 'count' is transitive. Person markers never occur without an accompanying intransitive verb.

Possessive case 

Simple possessives within Colville-Okanagan are predominantly a result of prefixation and circumfixation on a verb. However, Colville-Okanagan uses simple possessives as aspect forms on the verb in very complex ways. This practice is predominantly seen in Southern interior Salish languages.

Where prefixation occurs with -in / an in the 1st and 2nd person singular, /n/ may undergo deletion as below:

Ergative case 

In the case of verbs, Colville-Okanagan morphology handles transitivity in various ways. The first is a set of rules for verbs that only have a single direct object, transitive verbs. For the ergative case there are two variants of person markers a stressed and an unstressed.

Stressed and Unstressed

The stem: c'k-ən-t is the equivalent of the transitive verb 'count.'

wikn̓t (see it) is an example of a strong -nt- transitive past/present verb, with 'XX' identifying non-occurring combinations and '--' identifying semantic combinations which require the reflexive suffix -cut-

Accusative case 

There are two sets of verb affixes each containing two members that dictate the composition of a verb. The first set is composed of the affixes  –nt-, and  -ɬt-. The second set is composed of –st- and x(i)t- where ‘i' is a stressed vowel.

The major difference between two sets is how they incorporate affixes to remain grammatically correct. In the case of the –nt-, -ɬt- group, all particles and suffixes joining onto the stem and suffix of the verb will be identical for both. The –nt- affix connects to the stem of a transitive verb via suffixation. The suffix –nt- can only make reference to two persons: an actor and a primary goal.

q̓y̓əntin q'y'-ənt-in (I write something)

The -ɬt- affix is the ditransitive counterpart of –nt- and works in much the same. The difference between the two is that it refers to three persons: an actor, and two other actors or goals. Furthermore, -ɬt- is further differentiated from its ditransitive cousin -x(i)t- because it does not require a clitic to be a part of the verb.
	
In contrast to this group, -st- and –x(i)t- operate by unique rules. The –st- affix, much like its counterpart must be added to a verb stem by means of suffixation, it is also transitive, and refers to an actor and a primary goal, but it implies a reference to a third person, or a secondary goal without explicitly stating it.

q̓y̓əstin q'y'-əst-in. (I write it [for myself])
	
The -x(i)t- ditransitive affix shares all of the features of -ɬt- with the sole exception that it requires a clitic to be attached to front of the verb stem. The reason for the clitic in Okanagan is to add emphasis or focus on the second object, whereas -ɬt- makes no distinction.

Predicates and arguments 

Each clause in Colville-Okanagan can be divided into two parts: inflected predicates which are required for every sentence, and optional arguments. Colville-Okanagan allows a maximum of two arguments per sentence construction. These are marked by pronominal markers on the predicate. Each argument is introduced to the sentence via an initial determiner; the only exception to initial determiners is in the case of proper names which do not need determiners to introduce them. Predicates may be of any lexical category. There may be additional arguments added to a sentence in Okanagan via complementizers. Okanagan is unique among the majority of Salish languages for the inclusion of the complementizer.

Obliques 
Colville-Okanagan has one oblique marker that serves adapts it to several different functions depending upon the context in which it is used. The oblique marker ‘t' can be used to mark the object of an intransitive verb, as in the case below.

‘t' may also mark the agent in a passive construction, and it may be used to mark the ergative agent of transitive verbs. Finally, the oblique ‘t' may be used to mark functions including time and instrument:

‘t' may also coincide with the determiner  ‘iʔ' in the case of instrumentals and passive agents:

Complements 

There are a number of complements available to Colville-Okanagan to clarify its predicates among these are positional complements, which merely indicate the place of a predicate. 
In addition to positional complements, there are a variety of marked complements, complements used in Okanagan that express further meaning through a series of particles.

The first of the marked complements is the prefix /yi/. For the most part, /yi/ is an optional complement that is used in definite cases with the exception of cases when a proper noun is used. In such cases, the /yi/ prefix is not allowed. When /yi/ is used it refers to a definite referent.

wikən yiʔ sqilxʷ
" I saw the/those people."
The sequential complements are composed of the particles /ɬ/ and /ɬa/. /ɬa/ conveys temporal sequence while /ɬ/ represents a subordinate element.

way̓ x̌ast ɬ kʷ cxʷuy̓
"It's good if/that you come."

way̓ x̌ast  ɬa kʷ cxʷuy̓
"It will be good when/after you come."

Colville-Okanagan also contains a number of locational complements which refer to when or where something happened. It is a point of reference. The /l/ and the variant /lə/particles are used to tie a predicate to a time or place.
xʷuy̓ lə sənkʷəkʷəʔac.
"He went in the night"

Ablative complements in Colville-Okanagan come in the form of the /tl/ particle. Along with directional complements, /k̓/ and /k̓l/, Okanagan speakers can indicate motion. The ablative complement /tl/ only serves to indicate ‘moving away from.' For instance, in the sentence below, the ablative is ‘from (across the ocean).'

Kʷ scutxx tl sk̓ʷətikənx
"Were you saying [that he is] from Seattle?"

The directional complement's two particles represent both direction towards something, and direction towards a specific location. /k/ signifies movement towards something:

k̓ incitxʷ
"to my house" (not towards it)

The /k̓l/ particle modifies this sentence so that it specifies the house as the location to which the subject must move.
k̓əl incitxʷ
"To my house" (there specifically)

Classification 

Verbs may react in a number of different ways when a suffix is attached to the root stem of the word. Below are a number of ways in which intransitive roots are modified.

 -t can indicate a natural characteristic of the root
 c̓ik̓	"burn"
 c̓ik̓t	"burned"
 -lx indicates the subject is engaged in an activity
 qiclx	"run"
 -ils expresses state of mind.
 nk̓wpils	"lonely"
 -p expresses lack of a subject's control
 kmap		"darkening"

Transitives:

 -n involves action upon an object by a subject
 kʷuʔ caʔntis	"he hit me"
 -s involve action or state resulting from an activity.
 kʷu cˀaistixʷ
 -cut indicates when the action of a subject is directed toward oneself.
 tarqncut	"kick oneself"
 Transitive stems without person markings indicate imperatives
 nlk̓ipnt	"open it"
 Intransitives can express an imperative via the –x suffix:
 xʷuyx	"go"

Space, time, modality 
The Okanagan system relies heavily on its affixes to demonstrate tense, space, and time. Below are demonstrated various affixes that attach to roots to encode meaning.

Of the following two examples, they are only possible in the –n transitive paradigm.

ks- 	unrealized action

ikstxt̓ám
"I'm going to look after him"

səc- 	past perfect
ˁi-səc-txt'-am
"I've been looking after him."

The following examples are for intransitives.

-k	Unrealized: expresses an intentional future action or state. (I am going to…)
Kn kʷal̓t
" I'm warm"

-aʔx	Continuative: Action or state that is in progress
	kn scpútaʔx
	"I am celebrating"

Directional prefixes 

 ɬ- 	Movement back
 c-	Movement toward speaker
 kɬ-	down, and under

Prepositional case-markings for oblique objects 

 tl̓	from, source.
 k̓l	to, at, goal, recipient, dative.
 k̓	for, benefative.
 l	on, locative.
 nˁəɬ	with, comitative.
 ˁit	with, by, instrumental

See also
 Okanagan Nation Alliance
 Sinixt people
http://interiorsalish.com/

References

Bibliography

Language learning texts

Peterson, Wiley, and Parkin. (2004). Nsəlxcin 1: A Beginning Course in Colville-Okanagan Salish. The Paul Creek Language Association.
Peterson and Parkin. (2005). Captíkʷł 1: Nsəlxcin Stories for Beginners. The Paul Creek Language Association.
Peterson and Parkin. (2007). Nsəlxcin 2: An Intermediate Course in Okanagan Salish. The Paul Creek Language Association.
Peterson and Parkin. (2007). Captíkʷł 2: More Nsəlxcin Stories for Beginners. The Paul Creek Language Association.
Peterson and Parkin. (In Press). Nsəlxcin 3. The Paul Creek Language Association.
Peterson and Parkin. (In Press). Captíkʷł 3. The Paul Creek Language Association.
Manuel, Herbert, and Anthony Mattina. (1983). Okanagan Pronunciation Primer. University of Montana Linguistics Laboratory.

Narratives, songbooks, dictionaries, and word lists

Doak, Ivy G. (1983). The 1908 Okanagan Word Lists of James Teit. Missoula, Montana: Dept. of Anthropology, University of Montana, 1983.
Mattina, Anthony and Madeline DeSautel. (2002). Dora Noyes DeSautel łaʔ kłcaptikʷł: Okanagan Salish Narratives. University of Montana Occasional Papers in Linguistics 15.
Seymour, Peter, Madeline DeSautel, and Anthony Mattina. (1985). The Golden Woman: The Colville Narrative of Peter J. Seymour. Tucson: University of Arizona Press.
Seymour, Peter, Madeline DeSautel, and Anthony Mattina. (1974). The Narrative of Peter J. Seymour Blue Jay and His Brother-In-Law Wolf.
 Lindley, Lottie & John Lyon. (2012).  12 Upper Nicola Okanagan Texts.  ICSNL 47, UBCWPL vol. 32, Vancouver BC.
 Lindley, Lottie & John Lyon. (2013).  12 More Upper Nicola Okanagan Narratives.  ICSNL 48, UBCWPL vol. 35, Vancouver BC.
 Mattina, Anthony. Colville-Okanagan Dictionary. Missoula, Mont: Dept. of Anthropology, University of Montana, 1987.
Pierre, Larry and Martin Louie. (1973). Classified Word List for the Okanagan Language. MS, Penticton, B.C.
Purl, Douglas. (1974). The Narrative of Peter J. Seymour: Blue Jay and Wolf. ICSL 9, Vancouver, B.C.
Someday, James B. (1980). Colville Indian Language Dictionary. Ed.D. dissertation, University of North Dakota, Grand Forks. DAI 41A:1048.
Peterson and Parkin n̓səl̓xcin iʔ‿sn̓kʷnim: Songs for Beginners in Okanagan Salish. The Paul Creek Language Association.
Peterson and Parkin n̓səl̓xcin iʔ‿sn̓kʷnim 2: More Songs for Beginners in Okanagan Salish. The Paul Creek Language Association.
Peterson and Parkin. n̓səl̓xcin iʔ‿sn̓kʷnim 3: Even More Songs for Beginners in Colville-Okanagan.  The Paul Creek Language Association.

Linguistic descriptions and reviews

Arrowsmith, Gary L. (1968). Colville Phonemics. M.A. thesis, University of Washington, Seattle.
Baptiste, M. (2002). Wh-Questions in Okanagan Salish. M.A. thesis, University of British Columbia, Vancouver, B.C.
Barthmaier, Paul. (2004). Intonation Units in Okanagan. Pp. 30–42 of Gerdts and Matthewson (eds.) 2004.
Barthmaier, Paul. (2002). Transitivity and Lexical Suffixes in Okanagan. Papers for ICSNL 37 (Gillon, C., N. Sawai, and R. Wojdak, eds.). UBCWPL 9:1–17.
Charlie, William M., Clara Jack, and Anthony Mattina. (1988). William Charlie's "Two-Headed Person": Preliminary Notes on Colville-Okanagan Oratory. ICSNL 23(s.p.), Eugene, Oregon.
Dilts, Philip. (2006). An Analysis of the Okanagan "Middle" Marker -M. Papers for ICSNL 41 (Kiyota, M., J. Thompson, and N. Yamane-Tanaka, eds.). UBCWPL 11:77–98.
Doak, Ivy G. (1981). A Note on Plural Suppletion in Colville Okanagan. Pp. 143–147 of (Anthony) Mattina and Montler (eds.) 1981.
Doak, Ivy G. (2004). [Review of Dora Noyes DeSautel ła' kłcaptíkwł ([Anthony] Mattina and DeSautel [eds.] 2002.] AL 46:220–222.
Doak, Ivy and Anthony Mattina. (1997). Okanagan -lx, Coeur d'Alene -lš, and Cognate Forms. IJAL 63:334–361.
Fleisher, Mark S. (1979). A Note on Schuhmacher's Inference of wahú' in Colville Salish. IJAL 45:279–280.
Galloway, Brent D. (1991). [Review of Colville-Okanagan Dictionary ([Anthony] Mattina 1987).] IJAL 57:402–405.
Harrington, John P. (1942). Lummi and Nespelem Fieldnotes. Microfilm reel No. 015, remaining data as per Harrington 1910.
Hébert, Yvonne M. (1978). Sandhi in a Salishan Language: Okanagan. ICSL 13:26–56, Victoria, B.C.
Hébert, Yvonne M. (1979). A Note on Aspect in (Nicola Lake) Okanagan. ICSL 14:173–209, Bellingham, Washington.
Hébert, Yvonne M. (1982a). Transitivity in (Nicola Lake) Okanagan. Ph.D. dissertation, University of British Columbia, Vancouver, B.C. DAI 43A:3896.
Hébert, Yvonne M. (1982b). Aspect and Transitivity in (Nicola Lake) Okanagan. Syntax and Semantics 15:195–215.
Hébert, Yvonne M. (1983). Noun and Verb in a Salishan Language. KWPL 8:31–81.
Hill-Tout, Charles. (1911). Report on the Ethnology of the Okanák.ēn of British Columbia, an Interior Division of the Salish Stock. JAIGBI 41:130–161. London.
Kennedy, Dorothy I. D. and Randall T. [Randy] Bouchard. (1998). ‘Northern Okanagan, Lakes, and Colville.' Pp. 238–252 of Walker, Jr. (vol. ed.) 1998.
Kinkade, M. Dale. (1967). On the Identification of the Methows (Salish). IJAL 33:193–197.
Kinkade, M. Dale. (1987). [Review of The Golden Woman: The Colville Narrative of Peter J. Seymour (Mattina 1985).] Western Folklore 46:213–214.
Kroeber, Karl, and Eric P. Hamp. (1989). [Review of The Golden Woman: The Colville Narrative of Peter J. Seymour (Mattina, ed.).] IJAL 55:94–97.
Krueger, John R. (1967). Miscellanea Selica V: English-Salish Index and Finder List. AL 9(2):12–25.
Lyon, John (2013).  Predication and Equation in Okanagan Salish: The Syntax and Semantics of DPs and Non-verbal Predication University of British Columbia, PhD Dissertation. (http://hdl.handle.net/2429/45684)
Lyon, John. (2013). Oblique Marked Relatives in Southern Interior Salish: Implications for the Movement Analysis. Canadian Journal of Linguistics 58:2. pp 349–382.
Mattina, Anthony and Clara Jack. (1982). Okanagan Communication and Language. ICSNL 17:269–294, Portland, Oregon.
Mattina, Anthony and Clara Jack. (1986). Okanagan-Colville Kinship Terms. ICSNL 21:339–346, Seattle, Washington. [Published as Mattina and Jack 1992.]
Mattina, Anthony and Nancy J. Mattina (1995). Okanagan ks- and -kł. ICSNL 30, Victoria, B.C.
Mattina, Anthony and Sarah Peterson. (1997). Diminutives in Colville-Okanagan. ICSNL 32:317–324, Port Angeles, Washington.
Mattina, Anthony and Allan Taylor. (1984). The Salish Vocabularies of David Thompson. IJAL 50:48–83.
Mattina, Nancy J. (1993). Some Lexical Properties of Colville-Okanagan Ditransitives. ICSNL 28:265–284, Seattle, Washington.
Mattina, Nancy J. (1994a). Roots, Bases, and Stems in Colville-Okanagan. ICSNL 29, Pablo, Montana.
Mattina, Nancy J. (1994b). Argument Structure of Nouns, Nominalizations, and Denominals in Okanagan Salish. Paper presented at the 2nd Annual University of Victoria Salish Morphosyntax Workshop, Victoria, B.C.
Mattina, Nancy J. (1994c). Notes on Word Order in Colville-Okanagan Salish. NWLC 10:93–102. Burnaby, B.C.: Simon Fraser University.
 Mattina, Nancy J. (1996a). Aspect and Category in Okanagan Word Formation. Ottawa: National Library of Canada = Bibliothèque nationale du Canada, 1997. 
Mattina, Nancy J. (1996b). Anticausatives in Okanagan. Paper presented at the 4th Annual University of Victoria Salish Morphosyntax Conference, Victoria, B.C.
Mattina, Nancy J. (1999a). Future in Colville-Okanagan Salish. ICSNL 34:215–230, Kamloops, B.C. [Note also (Nancy) Mattina 1999c.]
Mattina, Nancy J. (1999b). Toward a History of the Inflectional Future in Colville-Okanagan Salish. University of California Santa Barbara Occasional Papers in Linguistics 17:27–42. Santa Barbara: University of California Santa Barbara.
Mattina, Nancy J. (2004). smiyáw sucnmínctәxw: Coyote Proposes. Pp. 289–299 of Gerdts and Matthewson (eds.) 2004.
O'Brien, Michael. (1967). A Phonology of Methow. ICSL 2, Seattle, Washington.
Pattison, Lois C. (1978). Douglas Lake Okanagan: Phonology and Morphology. M.A. thesis, University of British Columbia.
Petersen, Janet E. (1980). Colville Lexical Suffixes and Comparative Notes. MS.
Ray, Verne F. (1932). The Sanpoil and Nespelem: Salish Peoples of Northwestern Washington. UWPA 5. Seattle.
Schuhmacher, W. W. (1977). The Colville Name for Hawaii. IJAL 43:65–66.
Spier, Leslie. (1938). The Sinkaietk or Southern Okanagan of Washington. General Series in Anthropology, no. 6. Menasha, Wisconsin: George Banta Publishing.
Turner, Nancy J., Randy Bouchard, and Dorothy D. Kennedy. (1980). Ethnobotany of the Okanagan-Colville Indians of British Columbia and Washington. Occasional Paper Series 21. Victoria: British Columbia Provincial Museum.
Vogt, Hans. (1940). Salishan Studies. Comparative Notes on Kalispel, Spokane, Colville and Coeur d'Alene. Oslo: Skrifter utgitt av Det Norske Videnskaps-Akademi i Oslo, II, Hist.-filos. Klasse, No. 2, Jacob Dybwad.
Watkins, Donald. (1972). A Description of the Phonemes and Position Classes in the Morphology of Head of the Lake Okanagan. Ph.D. dissertation, University of Alberta, Edmonton.
Watkins, Donald. (1974). A Boas original. IJAL 40:29–43.
Young, Philip. (1971). A Phonology of Okanogan. M.A. thesis, University of Kansas.

External links

Colville-Okanagan language learning resources at Endangered Languages
Salish School of Spokane
En'owkin Centre
Interior Salish
Vocabulary Words in Okanagan-Colville
First Nations Languages of British Columbia entry
Map of Northwest Coast First Nations
Sinixt Nation Language Page

Syilx
Interior Salish languages
Indigenous languages of the North American Plateau
Indigenous languages of Washington (state)
First Nations languages in Canada
Languages of the United States
Native American language revitalization